At Bertram's Hotel is a work of detective fiction by Agatha Christie and first published in the UK by the Collins Crime Club on 15 November 1965 and in the US by Dodd, Mead and Company the following year. The UK edition retailed at sixteen shillings (16/-) and the US edition at $4.50. It features the detective Miss Marple.

Miss Marple takes a two-week holiday in London, at Bertram's Hotel, where she stayed in her youth. The hotel has a personality of its own, and a niche clientele of important church people, older women who lived through the Edwardian age, and girls looking for a safe place to stay in London. Miss Marple enjoys her trips around London, and learns that she cannot go back: life moves forward. She witnesses the complex lives of an estranged mother and daughter, and as always works with the police to solve crimes.

Reviews at the time of publication considered the denouement too far-fetched, but that it has "phenomenal zest and makes a reasonably snug read". Another reviewer called it "an ingenious mystery" reliant on Christie's skillful writing style. A review in 1990 found the plot "creaky" but praised the "hotel atmosphere" which "is very well conveyed and used". The character Elvira Blake was drawn well, and the careful description of the way older people look in 1965 compared to earlier eras, showed that Christie's "sharp eye had not dimmed".

Plot summary
Miss Marple is taking a two-week holiday in London, at Bertram's Hotel, courtesy of her nephew Raymond West. In her youth, she had stayed at this hotel. Since the war, the hotel has been renovated to create a distinct Edwardian era atmosphere with the best of modern conveniences and the best staff. Miss Marple encounters a friend taking tea, Lady Selina Hazy. Selina is on the lookout for friends, yet often mistakes people who look like her old friends. Miss Marple sees the famous adventuress Bess Sedgwick, plus her daughter, the young and beautiful Elvira Blake with her legal guardian Colonel Luscombe. She also meets the forgetful clergyman, Canon Pennyfather. American tourists consider the hotel as really English. She sees race driver Ladislaus Malinowski stop at the desk, and several times notices his car. She sees him with Elvira Blake.

Elvira will inherit money from her father when she turns 21. Her mother is alive, but estranged by choice from Elvira. Elvira seeks to learn the size of her inheritance and who gets it if she dies. Lawyer Richard Egerton, one of her trustees, tells her about the great wealth awaiting her. She works a scheme with her friend Bridget to gain money to fly to Ireland to find some unspecified information, and goes there. It is unclear if she returns by train or by air.

On the same day that Elvira travels to Ireland, Canon Pennyfather is to attend a conference in Lucerne. He fails to go to the airport the day before, going on the day of the conference instead, with a now useless airline ticket. He returns to Bertram's around midnight, disturbing intruders in his bedroom. He awakens four days later in a house far from London, and near the location of a recent overnight robbery of the Irish Mail train. He recuperates with a family unknown to him. His concussion blocks his memory of events. In an odd coincidence, some witnesses of the train robbery report seeing him on the train. When Archdeacon Simmons arrives and Pennyfather is still not home, he calls the police. Inspector Campbell is assigned the case, and is soon joined by Chief Inspector Davy, who sees links to unsolved crimes.

After the Inspector questions everyone at the hotel, Davy comes to ask more questions. He encounters Miss Marple; her observations of the hotel having an ambiance not just of the Edwardian era but of unreality match his. She tells him of seeing Canon Pennyfather at 3 am after she thought he had gone to Lucerne. She also tells him what she overheard while sitting in a public part of the hotel. Bess Sedgwick spoke with the hotel commissionaire Michael Gorman about their mutual past in loud voices. They had once been married in Ireland, which her family ended by parting them. She thought the wedding was not a legal marriage. But it was genuine, and her four further marriages were unwittingly bigamous.

On Miss Marple's last day at the hotel, speaking with Davy, they hear two shots ring out, followed by screams outdoors. Elvira Blake is discovered next to the corpse of Gorman. Elvira says he has been shot dead while shielding her from the gunfire. The gun belongs to Malinowski.

Davy calls Miss Marple and Pennyfather back to London. She is in her room and he enacts his likely movements when she saw him in the hallway. She realises she saw a younger man, though with Pennyfather's appearance, and recalls the German term doppelganger. This jogs Pennyfather's memory; he remembers he saw himself sitting on a chair in his own hotel room, just before he was knocked unconscious. The criminal gang was counting on his absence, and reacted violently on his appearance.

Davy and Miss Marple confront Bess Sedgwick as the orchestrator of these daring robberies, along with the maître d'hôtel Henry, and Ladislaus Malinowski when fast cars were needed. The hotel staff co-operated, and the owners handled the money side of the thefts. Bess confesses not only to this, but also to the murder of Gorman. Making a run for it, Bess steals a car and speeds away recklessly, crashing fatally. Elvira was the second person in that public room, overhearing the conversation between her mother and Gorman. She thinks it invalidates Sedgwick's marriage to Lord Coniston, and marks her as illegitimate and not the heiress. She wants to be wealthy so Ladislaus will marry her. However, her father's will names her explicitly, information she never learned.

Miss Marple is not convinced Bess killed Gorman. She believes that Elvira killed him. Davy agrees and will not let her get away with the murder.

Characters 
Miss Marple: older woman and amateur detective who resides in St Mary Mead, on vacation in London.
Mr Humfries: manager of Bertram's Hotel.
Miss Gorringe: works at the reception desk at Bertram's Hotel.
Rose Sheldon: chambermaid employed at Bertram's Hotel, whose previous work was as an actress.
Lady Selina Hazy: guest at the hotel, a friend of Miss Marple.
The Honourable Elvira Blake: beautiful young woman with fashionably long and straight flaxen hair who is a guest at the hotel, returning to England after time in Italy for schooling.
Mrs Carpenter: Elvira's chaperone while travelling from Italy to England.
Bridget: Elvira's best friend from the school in Italy; unknown to Elvira's guardian. She lives with her mother in Onslow Square.
Colonel Derek Luscombe: Elvira's guardian, with her at the hotel. He is one of three trustees who manage Elvira's inheritance
Mrs Mildred Melford: Colonel Luscombe's cousin who will host Elvira until she turns 21. She has daughters nearly the age of Elvira, and they live out of London, in Kent.
Mr Bollard: owner of the jewellery shop on Bond Street that Elvira usually frequents.
Bess, Lady Sedgwick: guest at the hotel, about 40 years old, well known for her life of daring activities and several marriages. She is Elvira's estranged mother.
Lord Coniston: Bess's second husband, and Elvira Blake's wealthy father. He was much older than Bess; she left him after their daughter was two years old. He died when Elvira was 5 years old.
Henry: master of the afternoon tea, "He sets the tone of the [hotel]". He is like a perfect butler.
Michael "Micky" Gorman: engaged as Commissionaire (doorman) at Bertram's Hotel a month before the story begins, an Irishman with a military background; Lady Sedgwick's estranged first husband, whom she married when she was 16 years old in Ballygowland, Ireland. He is fatally shot in front of the hotel.
Richard Egerton: lawyer who is one of three trustees for Elvira's inheritance.
Guido: Elvira's boyfriend when she was in Italy.
Inspector Campbell: younger inspector at Scotland Yard, assigned to find the missing cleric.
Chief-Inspector Fred "Father" Davy: Scotland Yard detective who sees the link between the missing person case and recent large scale burglaries. He works with Miss Marple.
Sergeant Wadell: sent from Scotland Yard to do the initial interviews regarding Canon Pennyfather, the missing person.
Canon Pennyfather: scholarly cleric with expertise in ancient languages and the Dead Sea Scrolls, who is also noted for his ability to lose track of time completely. He has a distinct appearance, as a man in his early sixties with a shock of white hair.
Ladislaus Malinowski: racing car driver in his 30s who works with Lady Sedgwick and with whom her daughter Elvira has fallen in love.
Mrs McCrae: Canon Pennyfather's housekeeper.
Archdeacon Simmons: Canon Pennyfather's friend and house guest who initiates the call to the police when his friend is missing for a week.
Mr Robinson: financial power-player who knows about all aspects of banking and high-finance. Davy approaches him to learn the true owner of the hotel. This character appears briefly in one of the Tommy and Tuppence novels (Postern of Fate), one Hercule Poirot story (Cat Among the Pigeons) and in Passenger to Frankfurt.
Wilhelm and Robert Hoffman: two wealthy Swiss brothers who are the true owners of Bertram's Hotel, as learned by Mr Robinson. They handle the illegal financial transactions of the hotel.

References to actual places or events
Bertram's Hotel is popularly believed to have been inspired by Brown's Hotel, where Agatha Christie often stayed when visiting London. However, Christie's authorised biographer Janet Morgan asserted that Bertram's was in fact based on the Flemings Mayfair hotel. Morgan cited correspondence between Christie and her agent Edmund Cork in which they decided to change the hotel proprietor's name and the street in which Bertram's was located in order to obscure the connection with Fleming's. Oxford Dictionary of National Biography also claims Fleming's as Christie's model.

Literary significance and reception
In The Guardian of 17 December 1965, Francis Iles (Anthony Berkeley Cox) said that "At Bertram's Hotel can hardly be called a major Agatha Christie [novel], for in spite of the presence of Miss Marples (sic) the denouement is really too far-fetched. But does the plot matter so much with Mrs Christie? What does matter is that one just can't put any book of hers down."

Maurice Richardson in The Observer of 12 December 1965 said, "A C is seldom at her best when she goes thrillerish on you. This one is a bit wild and far-fetched, but it's got plenty of that phenomenal zest and makes a reasonably snug read."

Robert Weaver in the Toronto Daily Star of 8 January 1966 said, "At Bertram's Hotel is vintage Agatha Christie: an ingenious mystery that triumphantly gets away with what in lesser hands would be the most outrageous coincidences."

This novel was listed on Anthony Boucher's Best Crime Novels of the Year for 1966, one of thirteen listed that year.

Brigid Brophy complained that the author offered "nothing like enough signposts to give the reader a chance to beat Miss Marple or the police to the solution".

Robert Barnard said of this novel that "The plot is rather creaky, as in most of the late ones, but the hotel atmosphere is very well conveyed and used. Elvira Blake is one of the best observed of the many young people in late Christie. Note the reflections in chapter 5 in the novel on the changed look of elderly people, showing that the sharp eye had not dimmed, even if the narrative grasp was becoming shaky."

Publication history
 1965, Collins Crime Club (London), 15 November 1965, hardcover, 256 pp
 1966, Dodd, Mead and Company (New York), 1966, hardcover, 272 pp
 1967, Pocket Books (New York), paperback, 180 pp
 1967, Fontana Books (Imprint of HarperCollins), paperback, 192 pp
 1968, Ulverscroft Large-print Edition, hardcover, 256 pp
 1972, Greenway edition of collected works (William Collins), hardcover, 253 pp
 1973, Greenway edition of collected works (Dodd Mead), hardcover, 253 pp
 2006, Marple Facsimile edition HarperCollins (facsimile of 1965 Collins Crime Club first edition), 6 March 2006, hardcover, 

The novel was first serialised in the UK weekly magazine Woman's Own in five abridged instalments from 20 November to 18 December 1965, illustrated with specially posed photographic layouts by Abis Sida Stribley. In the US the novel was serialised in Good Housekeeping magazine in two instalments from March (volume 162, number 3) to April 1966 (volume 162, number 4) with illustrations by Sanford Kossin and a photograph by James Viles.

Film, TV or theatrical adaptations

A BBC television film adaptation from 1987 starred Joan Hickson as Miss Marple and Caroline Blakiston as Bess Sedgwick.

A BBC radio adaptation by Michael Bakewell, broadcast in 1995-1996, starred June Whitfield as Miss Marple and Sian Phillips as Bess Sedgwick.

ITV broadcast its adaptation on 23 September 2007 as part of the third series of Agatha Christie's Marple, starring Geraldine McEwan. This version included many substantial changes to the plot, characters, atmosphere and the finale of the original novel, and added overtly contemporary social themes.

References

External links
 At Bertram's Hotel at Agatha Christie official website
 
 

1965 British novels
British novels adapted into films
Collins Crime Club books
Miss Marple novels
British novels adapted into television shows
Novels first published in serial form
Novels set in hotels
Novels set in London
Works originally published in Woman's Own